The 2001 South African motorcycle Grand Prix was the second round of the 2001 Grand Prix motorcycle racing season. It took place on the weekend of 20–22 April 2001 at the Phakisa Freeway.

500 cc classification

250 cc classification

125 cc classification

Championship standings after the race (500cc)

Below are the standings for the top five riders and constructors after round two has concluded.

Riders' Championship standings

Constructors' Championship standings

 Note: Only the top five positions are included for both sets of standings.

References

South African motorcycle Grand Prix
South African
South African Motorcycle Grand Prix, 2001
South African Motorcycle Grand Prix